Several Canadian naval units have been named HMCS Nootka.

  was a  that served with the Royal Canadian Navy from 1938 to 1943 before being renamed  and decommissioned in 1945.
  was a  destroyer that served the Royal Canadian Navy from 1946 to 1964.

Battle honours
 Korea 1951–52

References

 Government of Canada Ships' Histories - HMCS Nootka

Royal Canadian Navy ship names